Will It Snow for Christmas? is a South Korean television melodrama series starring Go Soo, Han Ye-seul, Song Jong-ho, Sunwoo Sun, and Jo Min-su. It aired on SBS from December 2, 2009 to January 28, 2010 on Wednesdays and Thursdays at 21:55 for 16 episodes.

Cast
Go Soo as Cha Kang-jin
Kim Soo-hyun as teenage Kang-jin
Han Ye-seul as Han Ji-wan
Nam Ji-hyun as teenage Ji-wan
Song Jong-ho as Park Tae-joon
Sunwoo Sun as Lee Woo-jung
Jo Min-su as Cha Chun-hee (Kang-jin's mother)
Chun Ho-jin as Han Joon-soo
Kim Do-yeon as Seo Young-sook
Song Joong-ki as Han Ji-yong (Ji-wan's older brother)
Kim Ki-bang as Cha Bu-san (Kang-jin's younger brother)
Seo Jae-wook as teenage Bu-san
Seok Jin-yi as Lee Jin-kyung
Yang So-young as teenage Jin-kyung
Kim Kwang-min as Seo Jae-hyun
Kim Joon-hyung as Kyung-soo
Min Ji-young as Miss Sun
Kim In-tae as Noh Gyo-soo
Kim Hyung-bum as Kim Jung-pil
Yeo Min-joo as Song Yoon-joo
Do Ji-han as Park Jong-suk
Baek Seung-hyeon
Kim Kwang-kyu as Kang-jin's homeroom teacher

Ratings
According to TNS Media Korea, episodes one and two achieved a rating of 8.6% and 7.7% nationwide and ranked second against its rivals Iris on KBS and Hero on MBC. The ratings of the rerun for episodes one and two, however, were recorded to be 8.7% and 11.4% nationwide, surpassing its original broadcast.

Source: TNS Media Korea

See also
 List of Christmas films

References

External links
Will It Snow for Christmas? official SBS website 

Seoul Broadcasting System television dramas
2009 South Korean television series debuts
2010 South Korean television series endings
2010s South Korean television series
Korean-language television shows
South Korean romance television series
South Korean melodrama television series
Television shows written by Lee Kyung-hee
Television series by IHQ (company)
Christmas television series